Chris Guccione and Lleyton Hewitt were the defending champions, but Hewitt chose to participate in the Davis Cup quarterfinals instead. Guccione played alongside Matthew Ebden, but lost in the first round to Johan Brunström and Marcelo Demoliner.
Jonathan Marray and Aisam-ul-Haq Qureshi won the title, defeating Nicholas Monroe and Mate Pavić in the final, 4–6, 6–3, [10–8].

Seeds

Draw

References 
 Draw

2015 Hall of Fame Tennis Championships